Ekkehard Schulz (born 10 June 1958) is a German sailor. He competed in the men's 470 event at the 1988 Summer Olympics.

References

External links
 

1958 births
Living people
German male sailors (sport)
Olympic sailors of East Germany
Sailors at the 1988 Summer Olympics – 470
Sportspeople from Halle (Saale)